This is a  list of countries without armed forces. The term country here means sovereign states and not dependencies (e.g., Guam, Northern Mariana Islands, Bermuda) whose defense is the responsibility of another country or an army alternative. The term armed forces refers to any government-sponsored defense used to further the domestic and foreign policies of their respective government. Some of the countries listed, such as Iceland and Monaco, have no standing armies but still have a non-police military force.

Many of the 21 countries listed here typically have had a long-standing agreement with a former colonial or protecting power; one example of the latter is the agreement between Monaco and France, which has existed for at least 300 years.
Similarly, the Compact of Free Association nations of the Marshall Islands, Federated States of Micronesia (FSM), and Palau rely on the United States for their defense.  They ensure their national security concerns are addressed through annual Joint Committee Meetings to discuss defense matters with US Pacific Command.  Andorra has a small army, and can request defensive aid if necessary, while Iceland has a unique agreement from 1951 with the United States which requires them to provide defense to Iceland when needed, although permanent armed forces have not been stationed there since 2006.

The remaining countries are responsible for their own defense, and operate either without any armed forces, or with limited armed forces. Some of the countries, such as Costa Rica and Grenada, underwent a process of demilitarization. Other countries were formed without armed forces, such as Samoa over  years ago; the primary reason being that they were, or still are, under protection from another nation at their point of independence.

Countries without armed forces

Countries with no standing army but limited military

See also
List of countries by military expenditures
List of countries by number of military and paramilitary personnel
List of militaries by country
List of militaries that recruit foreigners
Protectorate

References

Further reading
 
 

Military, countries without an army
Armed forces, without